Pages of Life may refer to:

 Pages of Life (album), a 1990 album by the Desert Rose Band
 Pages of Life (1922 film), a silent British drama film
 Pages of Life (1974 film), an Azerbaijani Soviet film
 Páginas da Vida (Pages of Life), a Brazilian telenovela

See also
 Pages of Life - Chapters I & II, a 1998 album by Fred Hammond